was one of four s built for the Imperial Japanese Navy during World War II.

Background and description
The Japanese called these ships  Kaibōkan, "ocean defence ships", (Kai = sea, ocean, Bo = defence, Kan = ship), to denote a multi-purpose vessel. They were initially intended for patrol and fishery protection, minesweeping and as convoy escorts.

The main armament of the Shimushu class consisted of three Type 3  guns in single mounts, one superfiring pair aft and one mount forward of the superstructure. They were built with four Type 96  anti-aircraft guns in two twin-gun mounts, but the total was increased to 15 guns by August 1943. A dozen depth charges were stowed aboard initially, but this was doubled in May 1942 when their minesweeping gear was removed. The anti-submarine weaponry later rose to 60 depth charges with a Type 97  trench mortar and six depth charge throwers.

Construction and career
In July 1943 Kunashiri participated in the Kiska evacuation aspect of Operation Ke. During the war Kunashiri operated mostly in the Kuriles and Hokkaido area escorting various convoys. On 28 July 1944. she was reported "damaged" by unknown cause- . After the end of World War II Kunashiri returned to Sasebo and was later used by the Allied Repatriation Service. On 4 June 1946 while en route to Uraga the vessel ran aground and was later abandoned. In attempts to rescue her, the  also ran aground, while at the same time, she too was repatriating Japanese troops from Singapore.

Notes

References
 

World War II naval ships of Japan
Shimushu-class escort ships
1940 ships
Ships of the Aleutian Islands campaign
Maritime incidents in 1946
Ships built in Japan